Edda Bonutto (1939–1998) was an Australian female international lawn bowler.

Bowls career
She won a silver medal in the women's pairs with Maureen Hobbs at the 1990 Commonwealth Games in Auckland.

Four years later she competed in the singles at the 1994 Commonwealth Games in Victoria, British Columbia, Canada.

She won two medals at the 1991 Asia Pacific Bowls Championships, including a gold in the pairs with Daphne Shaw, in Kowloon, Hong Kong.

References

1939 births
1998 deaths
Australian female bowls players
Commonwealth Games silver medallists for Australia
Commonwealth Games medallists in lawn bowls
Bowls players at the 1990 Commonwealth Games
Bowls players at the 1994 Commonwealth Games
20th-century Australian women
Medallists at the 1990 Commonwealth Games